Old Right may refer to:
 The ideology and policies of the Conservative Party that predated the ideological shift led by Margaret Thatcher, see one-nation conservatism
 Old Right (United States), an American political movement in the 1930s–1960s

See also
New Right (disambiguation)